Makutano is a settlement in Kenya's West Pokot County.

Location
The coordinates to the town are: 1°15'19.0"N, 35°05'31.0"E (Latitude:1.255286; Longitude:35.091950).

Overview
Makutano lies adjacent to Kapenguria, the location of the county headquarters and is part of the greater Kapenguria Metropolitan Area. Makutano is the location of the Makutano Stadium of West Pokot County.

References

External links
 Governor’s Speech During State of the County Address - 5 May 2015

Populated places in West Pokot County